Rock'n Roll Gangster is the only studio album by Fieldy's Dreams, a hip hop project of Korn bass guitarist Reginald "Fieldy" Arvizu. It was released on January 22, 2002 via Epic Records. Production was handled by Bjorn "Polarbear" Soderberg and Fieldy himself. The album features guest appearances from RBX, Angela Rascoe, Helluva, Jonathan Davis, Polarbear, Son Doobie and Tre Hardson. Rock'n Roll Gangster peaked at number 15 on the Billboard Heatseekers Albums chart in the US.

Track listing
"Cocky"  – 0:16
"Baby Hugh Hef"  – 3:20
"Rock N Roll Gangster"  – 0:21
"Are You Talking to Me" (feat. Helluva)  – 2:34
"Just for Now" (feat. Jonathan Davis) – 3:29
"You Saved Me"  – 3:01
"Munky Rage"  – 0:19
"Put a Week on It" (feat. Son Doobie) – 3:33
"Child Vigilante"  – 3:58
"Korn Gigglebox"  – 0:20
"Sugar-Coated" (feat. Tre Hardson) – 3:05
"Comin From a Friend"  – 3:04
"One Love" (feat. Angela Rascoe) – 3:25
"Ortiz Anthem" (feat. RBX) – 3:39
"Special K Buzz"  – 0:16
"Bleu"  – 2:47
"Do What You Feel" (feat. RBX & Polarbear) – 2:58

References

External links

Korn
2002 debut albums
Epic Records albums
Fieldy's Dreams albums